Long Time Coming or Long Time Comin' may refer to:

Albums
 A Long Time Comin', by the Electric Flag, 1968
 A Long Time Coming, by Wayne Brady, 2008
 A Long Time Coming (A Change Is Gonna Come), by Evelyn "Champagne" King, 1985
 Long Time Comin', by Shenandoah, 1992
 Long Time Coming (Jonny Lang album) or the title song, 2003
 Long Time Coming (Ready for the World album) or the title song, 1986
 Long Time Coming, by eLDee, 2004

Songs
 "Long Time Coming" (Cheap Trick song), 2017
 "Long Time Coming" (Delays song), 2004
 "Long Time Comin, by Bruce Springsteen from Devils & Dust, 2005
 "Long Time Comin, by Florida Georgia Line from Life Rolls On, 2021
 "Long Time Coming", by Humanzi, 2006

Television
 "Long Time Coming" (Homeland), an episode